The Wilbrook was an English automobile manufactured only in 1913 by Brooks and Spencer in Levenshulme, Manchester.  A cyclecar, it featured a 9 hp JAP V-twin engine, four seats, and four-wheel brakes.

See also
 List of car manufacturers of the United Kingdom

References
David Burgess Wise, The New Illustrated Encyclopedia of Automobiles.

Defunct motor vehicle manufacturers of England
Cyclecars
Defunct companies based in Manchester
Manufacturing companies based in Manchester